The Lady from Trévelez (Spanish:La señorita de Trévelez) is a 1936 Spanish drama film directed by Edgar Neville and starring Edmundo Barbero, Antoñita Colomé and Fernando Freyre de Andrade. The film is based on the play of the same name by Carlos Arniches. It was remade in 1956 as Calle Mayor.

Cast
In alphabetical order
 Edmundo Barbero 
 Antoñita Colomé 
 Fernando Freyre de Andrade 
 María Gámez
 Luis Heredia 
 María Luisa Moneró 
 Nicolás Rodríguez 
 Alberto Romea 
 Juan Torres Roca

References

Bibliography
 Labanyi, Jo & Pavlović, Tatjana. A Companion to Spanish Cinema. John Wiley & Sons, 2012.

External links 

1936 films
Spanish drama films
1936 drama films
1930s Spanish-language films
Films directed by Edgar Neville
Spanish films based on plays
Films based on works by Carlos Arniches
Spanish black-and-white films